Palmeiras Nordeste Futebol, commonly known as Palmeiras Nordeste, was a Brazilian football club based in Feira de Santana, Bahia state. They competed in the Série C once. The club was formerly known as Associação Atlética Independente.

History
The club was founded on August 22, 2000 as Associação Atlética Independente. Palmeiras Nordeste won the Campeonato Baiano Second Level in 2001. After joining a partnership with Sociedade Esportiva Palmeiras of São Paulo in 2002, the club was renamed to Palmeiras Nordeste Futebol. The club competed in the Série C in 2002, when they were eliminated in the First Stage of the competition. The club won the Taça Estado da Bahia in 2003. Palmeiras Nordeste folded a few years after their partnership with Sociedade Esportiva Palmeiras ended.

Achievements

 Campeonato Baiano Second Level:
 Winners (1): 2001
 Taça Estado da Bahia:
 Winners (1): 2003

Stadium

Palmeiras Nordeste Futebol played their home games at Estádio Municipal Alberto Oliveira, nicknamed Estádio Joia da Princesa. The stadium has a maximum capacity of 16,274 people.

References

Association football clubs established in 2000
Defunct football clubs in Bahia
Sociedade Esportiva Palmeiras
2000 establishments in Brazil

fr:Palmeiras do Nordeste